New Life Worship is the contemporary worship music band out of 
New Life Church in Colorado Springs, Colorado.

History
Associated with Colorado's New Life Church, the worship group New Life Worship was launched in 1991 when Parsley formed the New Life Ministries. New Life Worship made their debut in 1998 with the album Celebrate New Life.
The band is known for its songwriters (Ross Parsley, Jon Egan, Glenn Packiam, Jared Anderson, Cory Asbury, and Pete Sanchez) and worship leaders.

New Life Worship is now under the direction of Pete Sanchez, while Jon Egan leads most Sundays at New Life North. As of 2021, they began inviting many more well-known leaders like Dee Wilson and his wife, Grammy winner Micah Massey; Grammy winner Andi Rozier (former leader of Vertical Worship); and Aaron Keys (founder of 10,000 Fathers Worship School, which is now at New Life Church).

Discography
Albums series
 Celebrate New Life (1998)
 I Am Free (2004)
 My Savior Lives (2006)
 Worship Tools - My Savior Lives (Resource Edition) (2007)
 Counting on God (2008)
 Turned (2013)
 Strong God: Live (2013)
 You Hold It All (2015)
 Soak (2015)
 Живу, чтобы славить (in Russian) (2018)

EPs
 Over It All (Live) (2022)

New Life Worship Kids
 We Belong to Jesus (2014)

References

New Life Church (Colorado Springs, Colorado)
Musical groups established in 2004
Musical groups from Colorado
American Christian musical groups
Performers of contemporary worship music
American Christian rock groups
American gospel musical groups
Christian record labels
American record labels